Ray Sorensen may refer to:
 Ray Sorensen (gymnast)
 Ray Sorensen (politician)